The 2015–16 Basketball League of Serbia season is the 10th season of the Basketball League of Serbia, the highest professional basketball league in Serbia. It is also 72nd national championship played by Serbian clubs inclusive of nation's previous incarnations as Yugoslavia and Serbia & Montenegro.

The first half of the season consists of 14 teams and 182-game regular season (26 games for each of the 14 teams) began on October 2, 2015, and will end on March 26, 2016. The second half of the season consists of 4 teams from Adriatic League and the best 4 teams from first half of the season. Playoff starts soon after. The first half is called First League and  second is called Super League.

Teams for 2015–16 season

First League

Standings

Super League

Group A

Group B

Playoff stage

3rd place series for 2016–17 ABA League

Semifinals

Finals

Individual statistics

Rating

Points

Rebounds

Assists

Stats leaders

MVP of the Round

First League

Super League

References

External links
 Official website of Serbian Basketball League

Basketball League of Serbia seasons
Serbia
Basketball